Amravati Division, also known as Varhad, is an Indian one of the six administrative divisions of Maharashtra state in India. Amravati and Nagpur divisions constitute the ancient Vidarbha region. Amravati Division is bound by Madhya Pradesh state to the north, Nagpur Division to the east, Telangana state to the southeast, Marathwada region (Aurangabad Division) to the south and southwest, and Nashik Division to the west.

 Area: 46,090 km²
 Population (2011 census): 2,888,445
 Districts: Akola, Amravati, Buldhana, Washim, Yavatmal
 Largest City: Amravati
 Literacy: 93.03%
 Area under irrigation: 2,582.02 km²
 Railways: broad gauge 249 km, meter gauge 227 km, narrow gauge 188 km.

History of Amravati Division
Amravati Division roughly corresponds to the former province of Berar, which was ruled by the Maratha Maharajas of Nagpur till 1803. In 1853, it was occupied by the British, who decided to administer the province although it remained under the nominal sovereignty of the Nizam of Hyderabad.

In 1903, Berar Province was renamed Berar Division and added to the British-administered Central Provinces, which in 1936 was renamed Central Provinces and Berar. Upon Indian independence, the Central Provinces and Berar were reorganised as the Indian state of Madhya Pradesh. In 1956 the Indian states were reorganised on linguistic grounds, and Amravati and Nagpur divisions were transferred to Bombay State, which was split on linguistic lines into the states Maharashtra and Gujarat in 1960.

Amravati is the largest city in the division followed by Akola and Yavatmal.

Chikhaldara, the only hill station in Vidarbha, is situated in Amravati District.
Also the famous Melghat Tiger Reserve is situated in Amravati and Akola districts.

Administration
A Divisional Commissioner, an IAS officer appointed by the Government of Maharashtra, administers the division. Divisional Commissioners have included:
 Ganesh P. Thakur (2011–2012)
 D. R. Bansod (2013–2014)
 Dnyaneshwar Sadashivrao Dhok Rajurkar (2014–present)

The division is subdivided into five districts:
Akola
Amravati
Buldhana
Yavatmal
Washim

See also
Make In Maharashtra
Central Provinces and Berar

References

External links
Official website of the Amravati Divisional Commissioner

 
Divisions of Maharashtra
Berar
Vidarbha